See is a surname of English origin. See may refer to:

 Carolyn See (1934–2016), American author
 Clyde See (1941–2017), American lawyer and politician
 Elliot See (1927–1966), American aviator and NASA astronaut
 John See (1844–1907), Premier of New South Wales from 1901 to 1904
 Lisa See (born 1955), American writer and novelist
 Thomas Jefferson Jackson See (1866–1962), American astronomer

See also 

 See